Lilium nepalense, the lily of Nepal, is an Asian plant species in the lily family. It is native to the Himalayas and nearby regions: northern Thailand, northern Myanmar, Assam, Bhutan, Sikkim, Nepal, Uttarakhand, Tibet, and  Yunnan.

Lilium nepalense grows up to about 1 m high, usually less. The bulbs are stoloniferous, and for newly planted bulbs, the shoot will often come up some distance from the planting spot. Flowers are few, often solitary, pendant, pale green with a purple throat. The flowers are generally unscented during daylight hours and heavily scented after dark.

Cultivation
In cultivation, L. nepalense is best suited to a cool glasshouse, preferring a slightly acidic, humus rich soil that is well drained. It prefers the bulb to be kept cool while the plant itself can stand full sun. The plant should be well watered in spring, simulating a snow melt. After flowering, the plant should be kept fairly dry or the bulb will rot.

formerly included
 Lilium nepalense var. burmanicum, now called Lilium primulinum var. burmanicum
 Lilium nepalense var. ochraceum, now called Lilium primulinum var. ochraceum

References

nepalense
Flora of Asia
Plants described in 1820